This list of statisticians lists people who have made notable contributions to the theories or application of statistics, or to the related fields of probability or machine learning. Also included are actuaries and demographers.


A 
 Aalen, Odd Olai (1947–1987)
 Abbey, Helen (1915–2001)
 Abbott, Edith (1876–1957)
 Abelson, Robert P. (1928–2005)
 Abramovitz, Moses (1912–2000)
 Achenwall, Gottfried (1719–1772)
 Adelstein, Abraham Manie (1916–1992)
Adkins, Dorothy (1912–1975)
 Ahsan, Riaz (1951–2008)
Ahtime, Laura
 Aitchison, Beatrice (1908–1997)
 Aitchison, John (1926–2016)
 Aitken, Alexander (1895–1967)
 Akaike, Hirotsugu (1927–2009)
Aliaga, Martha (1937–2011)
Allan, Betty (1905–1952)
 Allen, R. G. D. (1906–1983)
 Allison, David B.
 Altman, Doug (1948–2018)
Altman, Naomi 
 Amemiya, Takeshi (1938–)
 Anderson, Oskar (1887–1960)
 Anderson, Theodore Wilbur
Anderson-Cook, Christine (1966–)
de Andrade, Mariza
 Anscombe, Francis (1918–2001)
 Anselin, Luc
Antonovska, Svetlana (1952–2016)
 Armitage, Peter (1924–)
Armstrong, Margaret
 Arrow, Kenneth
Ash, Arlene
Ashby, Deborah (1959–)
Asher, Jana
 Ashley-Cooper, Anthony
 Austin, Oscar Phelps
 Ayres, Leonard Porter

B 

Backer, Julie E. (1890–1977)
Bahadur, Raghu Raj (1924–1997)
Bahn, Anita K. (1920–1980)
Bailar, Barbara A. 
Bailey, Rosemary A. (1947–)
Bailey-Wilson, Joan (1953–)
Baker, Rose
 Balding, David
Bandeen-Roche, Karen
Barber, Rina Foygel
 Barnard, George Alfred (1915–2002)
Barnard, Mildred (1908–2000)
 Barnett, William A.
 Bartels, Julius
 Bartlett, M. S. (1910–2002)
 Bascand, Geoff
Basford, Kaye
 Basu, Debabrata (1924–2001)
Bates, Nancy
Batcher, Mary 
 Baxter, Laurence (1954–1996)
Bayarri, M. J. (1956–2014)
 Bayes, Thomas (1702–1761)
 Beale, Calvin
Becker, Betsy
Bediako, Grace
 Behm, Ernst
 Benjamin, Bernard
 Benzécri, Jean-Paul (1932–2019)
 Berger, James
 Berkson, Joseph (1899–1982)
 Bernardo, José-Miguel
 Berry, Don
 Best, Alfred M. (1876–1958)
Best, Nicky
Betensky, Rebecca
 Beveridge, William
 Bhat, B. R.
 Bhat, P. N. Mari
 Bhat, U. Narayan
 Bienaymé, Irénée-Jules
Bienias, Julia
Billard, Lynne (1943–)
 Bingham, Christopher
Bird, Sheila (1952–)
 Birnbaum, Allan (1923–1976)
Bishop, Yvonne (–2015)
 Bisika, Thomas John
Bixby, Lenore E. (1914–1994)
 Blackwell, David (1919–2010)
Blankenship, Erin
 Bliss, Chester Ittner (1899–1979)
 Block, Maurice
 Bloom, David E.
Blumberg, Carol Joyce
Bock, Mary Ellen
Boente, Graciela
 Bodio, Luigi
 Bodmer, Walter
 Bonferroni, Carlo Emilio (1892–1960)
 Booth, Charles
 Boreham, John
Borror, Connie M. (1966–2016)
 Bortkiewicz, Ladislaus (1868–1931)
 Bose, R. C. (1901–1987)
 Botha, Roelof
 Bottou, Léon
 Bowley, Arthur Lyon (1869–1957)
Bowman, Kimiko O. (1927–2019)
 Box, George E. P. (1919–2010)
 Boyle, Phelim
 Brad, Ion Ionescu de la (1818–1891)
Brady, Dorothy (1903–1977)
 Brassey, Thomas
Braverman, Amy
 Breiman, Leo
 Breslow, Norman (1941–2015)
Brogan, Donna (1939–)
 Brooks, Steve
Brown, Jennifer
 Brown, Lawrence D. (1940–2018)
Broze, Laurence (1960–)
Buck, Caitlin E. (1964–)
Bunea, Florentina (1966–)
 Burgess, Warren Randolph
Butler, Margaret K. (1924–2013)
Butucea, Cristina
 Buzek, Józef
Bycroft, Christine

C 

 Cai, T. Tony
 Caird, James
Calder, Kate
 Caldwell, John
 Cam, Lucien Le (1924–2000)
 Campion, Harry
 Candès, Emmanuel
Cannon, Ann R. 
Carriquiry, Alicia L. 
Carroll, Mavis B. (1917–2009)
Carson, Carol S.
Cartwright, Ann (1925–)
 Carver, Harry C.
 Castles, Ian
Çetinkaya-Rundel, Mine
 Chakrabarti, M. C.
 Chalmers, George (1742–1825)
Chaloner, Kathryn (1954–2014)
 Chambers, John M.
 Champernowne, D. G. (1912–2000)
 Chand, Rattan (1955–)
Chao, Anne 
 Charles, Enid (1894–1972)
 Charlier, Carl (1862–1934)
 Chebyshev, Pafnuty (1821–1894)
 Chen, Louis Hsiao Yun
Chen, Cathy Woan-Shu
Chen, Jie
 Chernoff, Herman (1923–)
 Chervonenkis, Alexey (1938–2014)
Chetwynd, Amanda
Chiaromonte, Francesca
 Chow, Yuan-Shih (1924–2022)
 Chuprov, Alexander Alexandrovich (1874–1926)
 Chuprov, Alexander Ivanovich (1841–1908)
Ciol, Marcia
Citro, Constance F. (1942–)
Claeskens, Gerda
Claghorn, Kate (1864–1938)
 Clark, Colin (1905–1989)
Clark, Cynthia (1942–)
 Clarke, Richard W. B. (1910–1975)
 Clayton, David (1944–)
Clyde, Merlise A. 
 Coale, Ansley J.
 Coats, Robert H. (1874–1960)
 Cochran, William Gemmell (1909–1980)
 Cockfield, Arthur
 Coghlan, Timothy Augustine (1856–1926)
 Cohen, Jacob
 Cohen, Joel E.
 Coifman, Ronald
 Coleman, David
Collet, Clara (1860–1948)
Coman, Katharine (1857–1915)
Cook, Dianne
 Cook, Len (1949–)
 Cordeiro, Gauss Moutinho (1952–)
 Cornfield, Jerome (1912–1979)
 Courtney, Leonard
 Cover, Thomas M.
Cowan, Cathy A.
 Cox, David (1924–2022)
 Cox, Gertrude Mary (1900–1978)
 Cox, Richard Threlkeld (1898–1991)
 Cramér, Harald (Sweden, 1893–1985)
 Crome, August Friedrich Wilhelm
 Crosby, James
 Cudmore, Sedley
 Cunliffe, Stella (1917–2012)
Cutler, Adele
Czado, Claudia
 Czekanowski, Jan
Czitrom, Veronica

D 

Dabrowska, Dorota
Dagum, Estelle Bee
Dale, Angela (1945–)
Daniels, Henry (1912–2000)
 Dantzig, David van (1900–1959)
 Dantzig, George (1914–2005)
Darby, Sarah
 Darwin, John (1923–2008)
Dasgupta, Nairanjana
Datta, Susmita
 David, Florence Nightingale (1909–1993)
Davidian, Marie
 Davies, Griffith (1788–1855)
 Davis, Kingsley (1908–1997)
 Dawid, Philip (1946–)
Day, Besse (1889–1986)
 Daykin, Christopher (1948–)
Dean, Angela
Dean, Charmaine (1958–)
Deane, Charlotte (1975–)
 DeGroot, Morris H. (1931–1989)
Delaigle, Aurore
DeLong, Elizabeth
 Deming, W. Edwards (1900–1993)
 Dempster, Arthur P.
 Desrosières, Alain
 Dewey, Davis Rich
 Diaconis, Persi (1945–)
Díaz, María del Pilar
Diener-West, Marie
Dietz, E. Jacquelin
 Dilke, Sir Charles
Ditlevsen, Susanne
Do, Kim-Anh
Dobson, Annette (1945–)
 Dodge, Harold F.
 Dodson, James
Doerge, Rebecca
 Doll, Sir Richard (1912–2005)
Dominici, Francesca
Donnelly, Christl
 Donnelly, Peter
 Donoho, David
 Doob, Joseph Leo
 Dublin, Louis Israel
 Duckworth, Frank
 Dudley, Richard M.
Dudoit, Sandrine
Dukic, Vanja
 Duncan, David F.
 Duncan, Otis Dudley
 Dunn, Halbert L.
Dunn, Olive Jean (1915–2008)
 Dunnell, Karen (1946–)
 Dunnett, Charles
Dupuis, Debbie
Dupuis, Josée
 Durbin, James
 Dvoretzky, Aryeh

E 

 Easton, Brian
 Eberly, Lynn
 Eckler, A. Ross (1901–1991)
 Eckler, A. Ross Jr. (1927–2016)
 Eeden, Constance van (1927–2021)
 Eden, Sir Frederick (1766–1809)
 Edgeworth, Francis Ysidro (1845–1926)
 Edwards, A. W. F. (1935–)
 Efron, Bradley (1938–)
 Eisenhart, Churchill (1913–1994)
 Elashoff, Janet D.
 Elderton, Ethel M. (1878–1954)
 Elderton, William Palin
 Eldridge, Marie D. (1926–2009)
 Ellenberg, Susan S. 
 Elliot, Jane (1966–)
 Elston, Robert C.
 Engel, Ernst (1821–1896)
 Engle, Robert F.
 Ensor, Kathy
 Erlang, A. K. (1878–1929)
 Erritt, John
 Esterby, Sylvia
 Etheridge, Alison (1964–)
 Ezekiel, Mordecai

F 

 Fabri, Johann Ernst
 Fallati, Johannes
 Fan, Jianqing
 Farr, William (1807–1883)
 Farrer, Thomas
 Fechner, Gustav (1801–1887)
 Fellegi, Ivan (1935–)
 Feller, William
 Fernique, Xavier
 Fienberg, Stephen
 Finetti, Bruno de (1906–1985)
 Finlaison, John
 Finney, D. J. (1917–2018)
 Fisher, Irving (1867–1947)
 Fisher, Sir Ronald A. (1890–1962)
Fitz-Gibbon, Carol (1938–2017)
Fix, Evelyn (1904–1965)
 Fleetwood, William (1656–1723)
 Fleiss, Joseph L. (1937–2003)
Flournoy, Nancy (1947–)
 Flux, A. William
 Foot, David
 Fowler, Henry
 Fox, John (1945–)
 Frankel, Lester
 Franscini, Stefano
 Freedman, David A.
 Freedman, Ronald
 Friedman, Milton
 Frigessi, Arnoldo di Rattalma (1959–)
Frühwirth-Schnatter, Sylvia (1959–)
Fu, Rongwei
Fuentes, Montserrat
Furlong, Cathy

G 

Gage, Linda
Gain, Anil Kumar (1919–1978)
 Gallant, A. Ronald
 Gallup, George (1901–1984)
 Galton, Francis (1822–1911)
Gantert, Nina
Gardner, Martha M.
Garfield, Joan
 Gauquelin, Michel
 Geary, Roy C.
Geer, Sara van de (1958–)
Geiringer, Hilda (1893–1973)
 Geisser, Seymour (1929–2004)
Gel, Yulia
Geller, Nancy (1944–)
Gelman, Andrew (1965–)
 Geman, Donald (1943–)
Geppert, Maria-Pia (1907–1997)
Ghazzali, Nadia (1961–)
 Ghosh, Jayanta Kumar
 Ghysels, Eric
Gibbons, Jean D. (1938–)
 Giblin, Lyndhurst (1872–1951)
 Giffen, Robert (1837–1910)
Gijbels, Irène
Gilbert, Ethel
Gile, Krista
Gilford, Dorothy M. (1919–2014)
 Gill, Richard D. (1951–)
 Gini, Corrado (1884–1965)
 Glass, David
 Glass, Gene V. (1940–)
Golbeck, Amanda L. 
Goldberg, Lisa
Goldin, Rebecca
 Goldman, Samuel
Goldschmidt, Christina
Goldsmith, Selma Fine (1912–1962)
 Goldstein, Harvey
 Gompertz, Benjamin (1779–1865)
 Good, I. J. (1916–2009)
 Good, Phillip (1937–)
 Goodnight, James
Gordon, Nancy
 Goschen, George
 Gosset, William Sealy (known as "Student") (1876–1937)
Gotway Crawford, Carol A.
 Goulden, Cyril (1897–1981)
 Granger, Clive
 Graunt, John (1620–1674)
 Gray, Mary W. (1938–)
 Grebenik, Eugene
 Green, Peter
 Greenland, Sander
Greenwood, Cindy
 Greenwood, Major (1880–1949)
 Griffiths, Robert
 Griliches, Zvi
 Grimmett, Geoffrey (1950–)
 Guerry, André-Michel
 Gumbel, Emil Julius (1891–1966)
 Guttman, Louis
Guo, Ying
 Guy, William (1810–1885)
 Gy, Pierre (1924–2015)

H 

 Haberman, Steven (1951–)
Hagood, Margaret Jarman (1907–1963)
Hahn, Marjorie
Haines, Linda M. 
 Hájek, Jaroslav (1926–1974)
 Hajnal, John (1924–2008)
Halabi, Susan
 Hald, Anders (1913–2007)
 Hastie, Trevor
 Hall, Peter Gavin (1951–2016)
Halloran, Betz
 Halmos, Paul (1916–2006)
Hamaker, Ellen (1974–)
 Hamilton, Lord George (1845–1927)
Hampe, Asta
 Hand, David (1950–)
Harch, Bronwyn
Harcourt, Alison
 Hardin, Garrett (1915–2003)
Hardin, Jo
 Harris, Ted (1919–2006)
Harter, Rachel M.
 Hartley, Herman Otto (1912–1980)
Hayek, Lee-Ann C.
 Hayter, Henry Heylyn (1821–1895)
 He, Xuming  
 Healy, Michael (1923–2016)
Hearron, Martha S. (1943–2014)
Heckman, Nancy E.
 Hedges, Larry V.
 Hein, Jotun (1956–)
 Helmert, Friedrich Robert (1843–1917)
 Henderson, Charles Roy (1911–1989)
Henningsen, Inge (1941–)
Herring, Amy H.
Herzberg, Agnes M.
Hertzberg, Vicki
Hess, Irene
 Heyde, Chris (1939–2008)
 Hibbert, Sir Jack (1932–2005)
 Hickman, James C. (1927–2006)
 Hilbe, Joseph (1944–2017)
 Hill, Austin Bradford (1897–1991)
 Hill, Joseph Adna (1860–1938)
 Hinkley, David V.
 Hjort, Nils Lid (1953–)
Ho, Weang Kee 
 Hoeffding, Wassily (1914–1991)
 Hoem, Jan (1939–2017)
Hoeting, Jennifer A.
Hofmann, Heike (1972–)
 Hollander, Myles (1941–)
 Hollerith, Herman (1860–1929)
 Holmes, Chris
 Holmes, Susan P.
Holran, Virginia Thompson
 Holt, Tim (1943–)
 Holtsmark, Gabriel Gabrielsen
 Hogben, Lancelot (1895–1975)
 Hooker, Reginald Hawthorn (1867–1944)
 Horn, Susan
 Hotelling, Harold (1895–1973)
Hsiung, Chao Agnes
 Hsu, Pao-Lu
Hu, Joan
Hubert, Mia
 Huff, Darrell (1913–2001)
Hughes-Oliver, Jacqueline
 Hunter, Sir William Wilson (1840–1900)
 Hunter, William (1937–1986)
Hurwitz, Shelley
Hušková, Marie (1942–)
 Hutchinson, Col
Hutton, Jane
Huzurbazar, Aparna V. 
Huzurbazar, Snehalata V. 
 Huzurbazar, V. S.

I 

 Ihaka, Ross (1954–)
 Iman, Ronald L.
Inoue, Lurdes 
Irony, Telba 
 Irwin, Joseph Oscar (1898–1982)
Isham, Valerie (1947–)
 Ishikawa, Kaoru (1915–1989)
 Isserlis, Leon (1881–1966)
Ivy, Julie

J 

 Jacoby, Oswald (1902–1984)
 Jaffrey, Thomas (1861–1953)
 James, Bill (1949–)
 Jaynes, Edwin Thompson (1922–1998)
 Jefferys, William H. (1940–)
 Jeffreys, Harold (1891–1989)
 Jellinek, E. Morton (1890–1963)
 Jenkins, Gwilym (1933–1982)
 Jevons, William Stanley (1835–1882)
 Jobson, Alexander (1875–1933)
 Johnson, Norman Lloyd (1917–2004)
 Johnston, Robert Mackenzie
 Jones, Edward
 Jones-Loyd, Samuel
 Jordan, Michael I.
 Jöreskog, Karl Gustav
 Jouffret, Esprit
 Juran, Joseph M. (1904–2008)
 Jurin, James (1684–1750)

K 

 Kac, Mark
 Kahwachi, Wasfi
 Kempthorne, Oscar
 Kendall, David George (1918–2007)
 Kendall, Sir Maurice (1907–1983)
 Kennedy, Joseph C. G.
 Khattree, Ravindra
 Khmaladze, Estate V.
 Kibria, B. M. G. (1963- )
 Kiefer, Jack
 Kiær, Anders Nicolai
 King, Gregory
 King, Willford I.
 Kingman, John (1939–)
 Kish, Leslie (1910–2000)
 Knibbs, George Handley
 Kočović, Bogoljub
 Kolmogorov, Andrey Nikolaevich (1903–1987)
 Koopman, Bernard
 Kott, Phillip
 Krewski, Dan
 Krumbein, William C.
 Kruskal, Joseph (1929–2010)
 Kruskal, William (1919–2005)
 Krüger, André
 Kuczynski, Robert René
 Kulischer, Eugene M.
 Kullback, Solomon (1907–1994)
 Kulldorff, Gunnar (1927–2015)
 Künsch, Hans-Rudolf
 Kurnow, Ernest
 Kuzmicich, Steve
 Kuznets, Simon

L 

 Lah, Ivo
 Laird, Nan
 Laslett, Peter
 Laspeyres, Étienne (1834–1913)
 Lathrop, Mark
 Law, John (1671–1729)
 Lawler, Gregory Francis
 Lawrence, Charles
 Lehmann, Erich Leo
 Lemon, Charles
 Leontief, Wassily
 Levit, Boris
 Lewis, Tony
 Lexis, Wilhelm (1837–1914)
 Li, C. C.
 Li, David X.
 Likert, Rensis
 Lilliefors, Hubert (c. 1928–2008)
 Lindeberg, Jarl Waldemar (1876–1932)
 Lindley, Dennis V. (1923–2013)
 Lindstedt, Anders
 Lindstrom, Frederick B.
 Linnik, Yuri (1915–1972)
 Liu, Jun
 Longman, Phillip
 Lord, Frederic M.
 Lorenz, Max O.
 Lotka, Alfred J. (1880–1949)
 Loève, Michel
 Lubbock, John
 Lundberg, Filip (1876–1965)

M 

 MacGregor, John F.
 Mahalanobis, Prasanta Chandra (1893–1972)
 Manwar, Khandakar Hossain (1930–1999)
 Mallet, Bernard
 Malthus, Thomas Robert (1766–1834)
 Mannheimer, Renato
 Mantel, Nathan (1919–2002)
 Mardia, Kantilal
 Marpsat, Maryse
 Marquardt, Donald (1929–1997)
 Marquis, Frederick
 Marschak, Jacob
 Marshall, Herbert
 Martin, Sir Richard
 Massey, Kenneth
 Masuyama, Motosaburo (1912–2005)
 Mauchly, John
 McClintock, Emory
 McCrossan, Paul
 McCullagh, Peter
 McEvedy, Colin
 McKendrick, Anderson Gray (1876–1943)
 McLennan, Bill
 McNemar, Quinn (1900–1986)
 McVean, Gilean
 Meeker, Royal
 Meier, Paul, (1924–2011)
 Meng, Xiao-Li (1963–)
 Mercado, Joseph
 Mihoc, Gheorghe
 Milliken, George A.
 Milliman, Wendell
 Milne, Joshua
 Milnes, Richard Monckton
 Mitchell, Wesley Clair
 Mitofsky, Warren
 Mohn, Jakob
 Moivre, Abraham de
 Molina, Edward C.
 Moore, Henry Ludwell
 Moran, Pat
 Mores, Edward Rowe
 Morgan, William
 Morris, Carl
 Morrison, Winifred J.
 Moser, Claus (1922–2015)
 Mosteller, Frederick (1916–2006)
 Mouat, Frederic J.
 Moyal, José Enrique
 Murphy, Susan

N 
 Nair, Vijayan N.
 Nason, Guy
 Neill, Charles P.
 Nelder, John (1924–2010)
 Nesbitt, Cecil J.
 Newmarch, William (1820–1882)
 Neyman, Jerzy (1894–1981)
 Nightingale, Florence (1820–1910)
 Niyogi, Partha (1967–2010)
 Noether, Gottfried E.
 Nordling, Carl O.
 Notestein, Frank W.

O 

 Ogburn, William Fielding
 Olshansky, S. Jay
 Onicescu, Octav
 Onslow, William
 Orshansky, Mollie

P 

 Paine, George
 Pakington, John
 Panaretos, John
 Parzen, Emanuel (1929–2016)
 Pearl, Raymond
 Pearson, Egon (1895–1980)
 Pearson, Karl (1857–1936)
 Peirce, Charles Sanders
 Pereira, Basilio de Bragança
 Pena, Daniel
 Peto, Julian
 Peto, Richard
 Petty, William (1623–1687)
 Petty-Fitzmaurice, Henry
 Piekałkiewicz, Jan
 Pillai, K. C. Sreedharan
 Pillai, Vijayan K
 Pink, Brian
 Pitman, E. J. G. (1897–1993)
 Plackett, Robin
 Playfair, William (1759–1823)
 Pleszczyńska, Elżbieta
 Pocock, Stuart
 Pollak, Henry O.
 Polson, Nicholas
 Preston, Samuel H.
 Price, Richard
 Priestley, Maurice
 Princet, Maurice
 Punnett, Reginald
 Pólya, George (1887–1985)
 Puri, Madan Lal (1929–)

Q 

 Quetelet, Adolphe (1796–1874)
Qazi Motahar Hossain (1897–1981) Bangladesh

R 

 Chand Rattan (1955–)
 Raftery, Adrian
 Raghavarao, D.
 Raiffa, Howard
 Ralescu, Stefan (1952–)
 Rao, C.R. (1920–)
 Rasch, Georg (1901–1980)
 Redington, Frank
 Reid, Nancy
 Reiersøl, Olav (1908–2001)
 Rhodes, E. C.
 Rice, Thomas Spring
 Richardson, Sylvia
 Rickman, John
 Ripley, Brian Daniel (1952–)
 Robbins, Herbert (1922–2001)
 Robbins, Naomi (1937–)
 Roberts, Gareth O.
 Roberts, Harry V.
 Robertson, Stuart A.
 Robine, Jean-Marie
 Robins, James
 Robinson, Claude E.
 Rosenthal, Jeff
 Rousseeuw, Peter J.
 Roy, Bimal Kumar
 Roy, S. N. (1906–1966)
 Rubin, Donald
 Rubinow, I. M.
 Rubinstein, Reuven
 Ruggles, Steven
 Russell, John
 Ryder, Dudley

S 

 Sagarin, Jeff
 Saha, Jahar
 Saint-Maur, Nicolas-François Dupré de
 Salsburg, David
 Samuel, Herbert
Samworth, Richard
 Sanders, William
 Savage, Leonard Jimmie (1917–1971)
 Sawilowsky, Shlomo (1954–2021)
 Scheffé, Henry (1907–1977)
 Schlaifer, Robert (1915–1994)
 Schultz, Henry
 Schuster, Arthur (1851–1934)
 Schweder, Tore (1943–)
 Scott, Elizabeth (1917–1988)
 Scurfield, Hugh Hedley
 Searle, Shayle R. (1928–2013)
 Sebastiani, Paola
 Semyonov-Tyan-Shansky, Pyotr (1827–1914)
 Shah, B. V.
 Shapiro, Samuel (1930–)
Swamy, Subramanium
 Shapley, Lloyd (1923–2016)
 Shaw-Lefevre, George
 Shepp, Lawrence
 Sheppard, William Fleetwood (1863–1936)
 Shewhart, Walter A. (1891–1967)
 Shrikhande, S. S. (1917–2020)
 Sichel, Herbert (1915–1995)
 Siegel, Sidney
 Silver, Nate
 Silverman, Bernard
 Simiand, François
 Simon, Leslie Earl
 Sinclair, Sir John (1754–1835)
 Sirkeci, Ibrahim
 Slutsky, Eugen (1880–1948)
 Smith, A.F.M
 Smith, Cedric (1917–2002)
 Smith, Walter L. (1926–2023)
 Snedecor, George W. (1881–1974)
 Snyder, Carl (1869–1946)
 Sokal, Robert R.
 Spearman, Charles (1863–1945)
 Speed, Terry
 Spengler, Joseph J.
 Spiegelhalter, David (1953–)
 Srivastava, J. N.
 Stamp, Josiah (1880–1941)
 Stanley, Julian C. Jr.
 Stanley, Edward
 Steele, J. Michael
 Steffensen, Johan Frederik (1873–1961)
 Stein, Charles
 Stephens, Matthew
 Stigler, Stephen (1941–)
 Stone, Richard
 Stouffer, Samuel A.
 Stoyan, Dietrich (1940–)
 Süssmilch, Johann Peter
 Sykes, William Henry
 Sylvester, James Joseph
 Sztrem, Edward Szturm de
 Shyamaprasad Mukherjee (1939–), India

T 

 Taguchi, Genichi (1924–2012)
 Teitelbaum, Michael
 Telser, Lester G.
 Thiele, Thorvald N. (1838–1910)
 Thorndike, Robert L.
 Thornton, John Wingate
 Thorp, Willard
 Thurstone, Louis Leon
 Tibshirani, Robert
 Tippett, Leonard Henry Caleb
 Tobin, James
 Todd, Emmanuel
 Tong, Howell
 Trewin, Dennis
 Trybuła, Stanisław
 Tufte, Edward
 Tukey, John (1915–2000)

U 
 Utts, Jessica
 Uyanto, Stanislaus S.

V 
 Vapnik, Vladimir (~1935–)
 Vaupel, James
 Villani, Giovanni
 Visman, Jan

W 
 Wahba, Grace
 Wakefield, Edward (1774–1854)
 Wald, Abraham (1902–1950)
 Walker, Francis Amasa
 Walker, Gilbert
 Wallace, Chris (1933–2004)
 Wallis, W. Allen
 Wanless, Derek
 Watson, Geoffrey
 Wedderburn, Robert
 Wegman, Edward
 Weibull, Waloddi (1887–1979)
 Weinstock, Arnold (1924–2002)
 Weldon, Walter Frank Raphael
 Welton, Thomas A.
 Wentworth-Fitzwilliam, Charles
 Westergaard, Harald Ludvig (1853–1936)
 Wheeler, Donald J.
 Whittle, Peter (1927–2021)
 Wickham, Hadley
 Wilcoxon, Frank (1892–1965)
 Wilk, Martin (1922–2013)
 Wilkinson, Leland
 Wilks, Samuel S. (1906–1964)
 Willcox, Walter Francis
 Wilson, Edwin Bidwell (1879–1964)
 Wilson, Harold
 Wishart, John (1898–1956)
 Wold, Herman (1908–1992)
 Wolfowitz, Jacob (1910–1981)
 Wood, George Henry
 Woodroofe, Michael (1940–2022)
 Woolhouse, Wesley S. B.
 Working, Holbrook
 Wright, Carroll D.
 Wright, Elizur
 Wright, Sewall
 Wrigley, E. A.
 Wu, Jeff C. F.

Y 

 Yates, Frank (1902–1994)
 Young, Allyn Abbott
 Young, Arthur (1741–1820)
 Young, Hilton
 Yule, G. Udny (1871–1951)

Z 

 Zaman, Arif
 Zarnowitz, Victor
 Zellner, Arnold (1927–2010)
 Zhaohuan, Zhang
 Žiberna, Aleš
 Zipf, George Kingsley (1902–1950)

See also 

 List of actuaries
 List of mathematical probabilists
 List of mathematicians
 Founders of statistics

External links
 
 
 

 
Statistics-related lists
Lists of scientists by field
Lists of mathematicians by field